Abune Qerlos (1928 – 2 December 2022) was the fifth Patriarch of the Eritrean Orthodox Tewahedo Church.

Ecclesiastical career
Prior to the election of Qerlos, the position of patriarch of the Eritrean Orthodox Tewahedo Church had been left vacant since the death of Abune Dioskoros in 2015. On 13 May 2021, Qerlos was elected Patriarch of Eritrea. His ordination and enthronement as Patriarch took place on 13 June.

Personal life and death
Qerlos died on 2 December 2022, at the age of 94.

References

1928 births
2022 deaths
Date of birth missing
21st-century Oriental Orthodox archbishops
Eritrean Oriental Orthodox Christians
Patriarchs of Eritrea